Evelina Cabrera (born 26 September 1986) is an Argentine football coach and manager. She lived on the street until she became first a teacher and then a football player for Club Atlético Platense. She started the women's football association in Argentina (AFFAR). She has spoken at the United Nations and been recognised by the BBC as one of their 100 women in 2020. In June 2021, she was appointed as Goodwill Ambassador for Equity in Sports of the Organization of American States (OAS).

Her Life 
Cabrera was born in San Fernando in 1986. When she was thirteen her parents split and neither of them accepted her custody. She ended up spending time of the street until she was seventeen. She was impressed how people shared food and looked after each other. However when her boyfriend hit her she thought that no one cared for her and tried to end her own life. She returned to school and went on to become a gymnatics teacher. She went with a friend to the football trials for Club Atlético Platense and she was recruited and she was on the team. She remained on the team until 2012 when injury stopped her continuing. She took to coaching and organising at the Club Atlético Nueva Chicago.

She was one of the first women in Argentina to become a football manager.

When she was 27, she founded the Asociación Femenina de Fútbol Argentino (AFFAR) Argentinian Women's Football Association. From when it started in 2013 she was the leader.

Carrera's work was noted and she was invited to talk at the United Nations. She said that she prepared what she was going to say but when it came to it she decided to just talk without notes. She understood that it was well received.

In 2020, she was still leading AFFAR. During the break from football during the Covid-19 pandemic she occupied her time with writing a book that she titled "Altanegra". The book explains her story and how she came to create the Argentinian Women's Football Association.

In 2020, Cabrera was recognised for her work and she was one of the BBCs 100 Women.

In June 2021, the Secretary General of the OAS appointed Cabrera as Goodwill Ambassador for Equity in Sports of the OAS. Her work is focused on promoting projects that close the gender gap and promote equity in sports.

References

1986 births
Living people
People from San Fernando de la Buena Vista
Argentine women's footballers
Argentine football managers
BBC 100 Women
Women's association footballers not categorized by position
Sportspeople from Buenos Aires Province